An école normale supérieure or ENS is a type of publicly funded higher education institution in France

École normale supérieure may refer to:

École normale supérieure de Lyon
École normale supérieure (Paris)
École normale supérieure Paris-Saclay
École normale supérieure de Rennes
École normale supérieure William Ponty